Zepernick (in German Bahnhof Zepernick) is a railway station in the village of Zepernick, Germany, part of the municipality of Panketal. It is served by the Berlin S-Bahn and a local bus line.

References

External links
Station information 

Zepernick
Zepernick
Buildings and structures in Barnim
Railway stations in Germany opened in 1881